Qarah Aqach (also Romanized as Qarah Āqāch; also known as Qareh Āghāj) is a village in Qara Bashlu Rural District, Chapeshlu District, Dargaz County, Razavi Khorasan Province, Iran. At the 2006 census, its population was 11, in 4 families.

References 

Populated places in Dargaz County